is a passenger railway station located in Saiwai-ku, Kawasaki, Kanagawa Prefecture, Japan, operated by the East Japan Railway Company (JR East).

Lines
Kashimada Station is served by the Nambu Line.

Station layout
Kashimada Station has two opposed side platforms serving two tracks, connected by a footbridge to an elevated station building. The station has a Midori no Madoguchi staffed ticket office.

Platforms

History
The station opened on 9 March 1927. With the privatization of Japanese National Railways (JNR) on 1 April 1987, the station came under the control of JR East.

Passenger statistics
In fiscal 2019, the station was used by an average of 19,557 passengers daily (boarding passengers only).

The passenger figures (boarding passengers only) for previous years are as shown below.

Surrounding area
Shin-Kawasaki Station on the Yokosuka Line is located 400 meters to the west.

See also
List of railway stations in Japan

References

External links

 JR East Station information 

Stations of East Japan Railway Company
Nambu Line
Railway stations in Kawasaki, Kanagawa
Railway stations in Japan opened in 1927